The Lawrence W. Levine Award is an annual book award made by the Organization of American Historians (OAH). The award goes to the best book in American cultural history. The award is named for Professor Lawrence W. Levine, President of the OAH 1992–1993, who wrote extensively in the field. A committee of 5 members of the OAH, chosen annually by the President, makes the award. The winner receives $1000.

The Awards
Source: Organization of American Historians

See also

 List of history awards

References

Awards established in 2008
American literary awards
History awards
History books about the United States